A pillbox hat is a small hat, usually worn by women, with a flat crown, straight, upright sides, and no brim.  It is named after the small cylindrical or hexagonal cases that were used for storing or carrying a small number of pills.

History and description
Historically, the precursor to the pillbox hat was military headgear. During the late Roman Empire, the pileus pannonicus or "Pannonian cap" – headgear similar to the modern pillbox hat – was worn by Roman soldiers. A similar hat was popular with the Flemish in the Middle Ages. In some countries, especially those of the Commonwealth of Nations, a pillbox-like forage cap, often with a chin strap, can still be seen on ceremonial occasions. The Royal Military College of Canada dress uniform includes such a hat, and similar caps were standard issue for the Victorian era British Army.  Another cap called a kilmarnock is a modern version of the traditional headdress worn by members of virtually all Gurkha regiments.

The modern woman's pillbox hat was invented by milliners in the 1930s, and gained popularity due to its elegant simplicity.  Pillbox hats were made out of wool, velvet, organdy, mink, lynx or fox fur, and leopard skin, among many other materials.  They were generally designed in solid colors and were unaccessorized, but could include a veil.

Jacqueline Kennedy, First Lady of the United States from 1961 to 1963, was well known for her "signature pillbox hats", designed for her by Halston, and was wearing a pink one to match her outfit on the day of her husband United States President John F. Kennedy's assassination in Dallas, Texas. Actress Natalie Portman wore a pillbox hat to play Kennedy in the 2016 biographical drama Jackie.

In popular culture
Pillbox hats are a satirical subject of the song "Leopard-Skin Pill-Box Hat" by Bob Dylan. The song first appeared on his 1966 album Blonde on Blonde. In 2013 experimental hip-hop group Death Grips released a song entitled "You Might Think He Loves You for Your Money But I Know What He Really Loves You for It’s Your Brand New Leopard Skin Pillbox Hat" named after the title of this song.

Gallery

See also
Bell-boy hat
Pillbox (military)
Lika cap

References
Notes

External links

Hats
Military uniforms
1960s fashion
History of fashion
North-West Mounted Police